Volero Zürich is a Swiss volleyball club based in Zürich. It has many teams (men's, women's and youth volleyball) with the women's team being the most successful and currently playing in the National League A. Since the mid 2000s, the club has also frequently participated in European competitions, most notably the CEV Women's Champions League. In 2018 the elite women's team joined Entente sportive Le Cannet-Rocheville, forming Volero Le Cannet, a team located in Le Cannet, France (Volero Zürich kept an elite team, but it restarted in a lower league).

Previous names
The club have competed under the following names:
 VBC Voléro Zürich (1973–2011), still used by the men's team
 Volero Zürich (2011–), used by the women's team

History

From the late 1990s, the women's team started to progress in the national leagues arriving at the National League A (NLA), but after just a couple seasons, due to financial reasons, the club was relegated. In 2003, part of the club (female elite squad and more than 120 young volleyball talents) was professionalized by founding the independent Volero Zürich AG, and the rest of the club remained as VBC Voléro Zürich (male and youth teams). Soon after the women's team started dominating the national league and cup, winning each on 12 occasions. The national success allowed the club to take part in European competitions, playing the Women's CEV Cup twice (in 2005–06 and 2009–10) and the CEV Women's Champions League over ten times with a best result of fourth place in 2006–07. The club also participated in multiple editions of the FIVB Volleyball Women's Club World Championship finishing third place in 2015 and 2017. The club has won the Women's Top Volley International (a minor international tournament) twice, in 2007 and in 2010.

Venues
Volero Zürich AG hosts matches in two main venues, both located in Zürich:
 Sportanlage Im Birch (National League / Swiss Cup) - 850 capacity
 Saalsporthalle (Champions League) - 2,500 capacity

Honours

Men
National competitions
 National League A: 1
1976–77

 Swiss Cup: 2
1974–75, 1977–78

Women
National competitions
 National League A: 12
2004–05, 2005–06, 2006–07, 2007–08, 2009–10, 2010–11, 2011–12, 2012–13, 2013–14, 2014–15, 2015–16, 2016–17

 Swiss Cup: 12
2004–05, 2005–06, 2006–07, 2007–08, 2009–10, 2010–11, 2011–12, 2012–13, 2013–14, 2014–15, 2015–16, 2016–17

Team

Notable players

  Valeriya Korotenko
  Oksana Parkhomenko
  Anja Spasojević
  Slađana Erić
  Tijana Malešević
  Nina Rosić
  Bojana Živković
  Brankica Mihajlović
  Foluke Akinradewo

References

External links

Volero Zürich AG Official website  - Women's professional team
VBC Voléro Zürich Official website  - Men's and youth teams

Swiss volleyball clubs
Sport in Zürich
Volleyball clubs established in 1973
1973 establishments in Switzerland
Inconsistent articles